The Alba Bible is a 1430 illuminated manuscript translation of the Old Testament made directly from Hebrew into Mediaeval Castilian. The translation was carried out under the direction of Moses Arragel, rabbi of the Jewish community of Maqueda in the Spanish province of Toledo, at the behest of Don Luis de Guzmán, Grand Master of the military-religious Order of Calatrava.

History

During the 15th century, many people within Spanish society held hostile views toward Jews. In the aftermath of a series of anti-Jewish riots centered in Madrid, Don Luis de Guzmán believed that he could help heal the rift and build a bridge of understanding between Christians and Jews by commissioning a Castilian translation of the Old Testament from the original Hebrew, accompanied by commentary from Jewish scholars interpreting the text of their holy book.

On April 5, 1422, Don Luis de Guzmán initiated his project by sending a letter to rabbi Moses Arragel inviting him to compose "vna biblia en rromançe, glosada e ystoriada."  It is not known what convinced rabbi Arragel to accept as he initially demurred in an extensive reply letter to Guzmán. Nevertheless, eight years later the bible was completed.

From 1492, the year in which the Alhambra Decree issued mandating the expulsion of all Jews from Spain, until 1622, when it resurfaced in the Palace of Liria owned by the House of Alba, the whereabouts of the Alba Bible were unknown. In 1922 an illustrated facsimile edition of 300 copies was published by the scholar Antonio Paz y Meliá.  In 1992, to commemorate the 500th anniversary of the expulsion, Mauricio Hatchwell Toledano, President of the Fundacion Amigos de Sefarad published 500 copies in an exact facsimile edition, one of which was given to Juan Carlos I of Spain, the reigning King of Spain.

Today the original Alba Bible is preserved by the House of Alba, and is on exhibition in the Palace of Liria, in Madrid. The original Bible has been valued at 2.5 million euros. Copies of the 500 limited edition facsimile copies reproduced in 1992 are sold for more than US$44,000.

Contents

The work comprises 513 folios and a rich collection of 334 miniatures that illustrate passages from the religious text. Although the text of the Alba Bible was the product of Rabbi Arragel, the elaborate artistic detail is wholly the product of Franciscans of Toledo.

The Alba Bible contains a series of comments on the writing of both Jewish and Christian theologians, including Abraham ibn Ezra, Maimonides, Nahmanides, R. Joseph Kimhi, R. Asher ben Jehiel, Shlomo ben Aderet, R. Ya'acob and Nissim of Gerona. There is also commentary taken from rabbinic literary sources such as the  Talmud and the Midrash.

Inserted at the beginning of the original work are 25 folios of correspondence between Rabbi Arragel and Don Luís Guzmán as well as between the rabbi and various Franciscans involved in illustrating the translation and discussing matters related to the collaboration.

References

Notes

Other references

. From the Spanish-language Wikipedia. Retrieved October 17–19, 2006, and containing the internal references:
(Ladino) AKI YERUSHALAYIM.
 El fabuloso patrimonio de los Alba, Grandes de España pero  de con Mayúsculas.

External link

15th-century biblical manuscripts
15th-century illuminated manuscripts
Illuminated biblical manuscripts
Jewish illuminated manuscripts
Jewish Spanish history
Bible translations into Spanish